Madonna is a 1999 Croatian film directed by Neven Hitrec and starring Ljubomir Kerekeš, Lucija Šerbedžija and Ivo Gregurević. It is based on a novel by Hrvoje Hitrec.

Plot

Reception
At the 1999 Pula Film Festival, Madonna received the Big Golden Arena for Best Film, and Kerekeš and Šerbedžija won Golden Arenas for Best Actor and Best Actress. The critics wrote favorably of the film's directing, editing and acting, but criticized the scenario for being ideologized.

References

External links
 

1999 films
1990s Croatian-language films
Works about the Croatian War of Independence
Croatian war films
Films based on Croatian novels
Yugoslav Wars films
1999 directorial debut films
1990s war films